Gadopiclenol, sold under the brand name Elucirem and Vueway, is a contrast agent used with magnetic resonance imaging (MRI) to detect and visualize lesions with abnormal vascularity in the central nervous system and in the body. Gadopiclenol is a paramagnetic macrocyclic non-ionic complex of gadolinium.

Gadopiclenol was approved for medical use in the United States in September 2022.

Names 
Gadopiclenol is the international nonproprietary name (INN).

References

External links 
 
 
 

MRI contrast agents
Pyridines
Heterocyclic compounds with 2 rings
Carboxylic acids
Polyols
Amides
Gadolinium compounds